Danish national cycle route 1, known as the Vestkystruten (West Coast Route), is the first of the 11 Danish National Cycle Routes. It runs from the Danish-German border at Rudbøl in Southern Jutland to Skagen, at the northernmost tip of Vendsyssel island.

It is part of EuroVelo 12 AKA the North Sea Cycle Route.

Route

The route starts at Rudbøl, a small village on the Danish-German border which is also the starting-point of Danish National Cycle Route 8 (the South Sea Route). From here it runs north through Skærbæk, Esbjerg, Hvide Sande, and Thyborøn where there is a ferry-crossing to the island of Vendsyssel. Beyond the ferry-crossing the route continues northward through Hanstholm and Hirtshals before ending in Skagen.

See also
Danish National Cycle Routes

External links
Website of Vejdirektoratet - the Danish Road Directorate
CykelGuide – National cycle routes in Denmark  (pdf file)

Cycleways in Denmark
Transport in the Region of Southern Denmark
Transport in the Central Denmark Region
Transport in the North Jutland Region